Estadio Meliton Dubon is a stadium located in Macuelizo, Santa Barbara. It holds fewer than 1,000 spectators.

Meliton Dubon, Estadio